The Bakersfield Open was a golf tournament on the LPGA Tour from 1952 to 1953. It was played in Bakersfield, California

Winners
1953 Louise Suggs
1952 Marlene Hagge, Betty Jameson, Betsy Rawls, Babe Zaharias (tie)

References

Former LPGA Tour events
Golf in California
Sports in Bakersfield, California
1952 establishments in California
1953 disestablishments in California
Women's sports in California